"Don't Cry / I Love to Party" is a double A-sided single released by Belgian singer/songwriter Kaye Styles and Australian born Irish singer/songwriter Johnny Logan. The songs are re-working of Logan's two winning Eurovision Song Contest songs, "Hold Me Now" and "What's Another Year". The single was released in July 2006 and included on Styles' album It Iz What It Iz.

Background and release
In 2006, Kaye Styles entered Eurosong '06, which was the Belgian national final for choosing the Belgian entry for the Eurovision Song Contest 2006, with the song "Profile". The song placed 6th in the final. During the final, two-time winner Johnny Logan was part of the professional jury awarding points. Following the final, the pair collaborated with Style re-working Logan's "Hold Me Now" as "Don't Cry" and "What's Another Year" as "I Love to Party". The single was released as a double-A sided single, and video clips were produced for both songs.

Track listings

Charts

References

2006 singles
2006 songs
Johnny Logan (singer) songs
Songs written by Johnny Logan (singer)